The Pacific Crest Drum and Bugle Corps is a World Class competitive junior drum and bugle corps.  Based in Diamond Bar, California and City of Industry, California, Pacific Crest is a member corps of Drum Corps International (DCI).

History
Pacific Crest was founded in 1993 to serve the youth in the eastern part of Los Angeles County. Marching only 33 members in its inaugural season, the corps grew in size and ability while maintaining a local California profile. The corps did not perform outside its home state until traveling to Texas for two shows in 2000. The corps journeyed to the Northwest in 2002, and it finally entered the national competition scene by attending its first DCI Championships at Orlando, Florida in 2003, where many drum corps fans unfamiliar with Pacific Crest were surprised as the corps reached the semifinal round. Although it now tours nationally each season, the corps has maintained a policy of spending approximately the first half of the season near home. While this has possibly prevented Pacific Crest from ascending beyond the second tier of the World Class corps, it has helped to sustain the corps financially by limiting its travel expenses. Pacific Crest has advanced to DCI Semifinals in 2003, 2007–08, 2011–19, and 2022.

In addition to performing in DCI, Pacific Crest has also performed at several independent events, including with the Los Angeles Philharmonic at the Hollywood Bowl and in the 2019 Rose Parade.

Sponsorship
Pacific Crest Drum and Bugle Corps is sponsored by the Pacific Crest Youth Arts Organization (PCYAO), a 501(c)(3) musical organization that has a Board of Directors, corps director, and staff assigned to carry out the organization's mission. Phil Mortensen is President of the Board, and Stuart Pompel is the corps' Executive Director. PCYAO has previously supported a winterguard unit (2002-2005) that competed in Winter Guard International (WGI) and the Winter Guard Association of Southern California (WGASC) circuits. The winterguard competed in the Independent World Class (2002), Independent Open Class (2003), and Independent A Class (2004-2005); the winterguard was a WGI finalist and WGASC gold medalist for the Independent A Class in 2004 and 2005. The organization also sponsors a summer camp for current and prospective high school drum majors. PCYAO receives a part of its funding from the Los Angeles County Board of Supervisors through the Los Angeles County Arts Commission.

Show summary (1994–2022) 
Source:

References

External links
Official website

Drum Corps International World Class corps
Diamond Bar, California
Musical groups established in 1993
1993 establishments in California